Clockville is a hamlet in Madison County, New York, United States. Clockville has a post office with ZIP code 13043.

References

Hamlets in Madison County, New York
Hamlets in New York (state)